Frederick Henry Thomson de Malmanche (15 March 1900 – 1988) was a politician and diplomat.

Biography
de Malmanche was married to Olive Lolo Gaudin. He was manager of the Auckland branch of the Charles Haines Advertising Agency Limited.

In 1959 he stood on the Citizens & Ratepayers (C&R) ticket for the Auckland City Council and was elected a member. He was re-elected in 1962 and held a seat on the council for four years before he resigned in 1963. His resignation instigated a by-election to the council.

In 1962 de Malmanche was part of a group of C&R councillors (alongside Charlie Passmore and Reg Savory) who had persuaded the president of the Auckland Chamber of Commerce Edgar Faber to run for the Auckland mayoralty against Dove-Myer Robinson. They convinced him to do so by telling him exaggerated stories of Robinson's personal conduct and his behaviour during council business. Faber began to regret being involved in the mayoral contest as it began to affect his health and planned to withdraw from the race, but de Malmanche and the other C&R councillors insisted he continue. Shortly after the election Faber discovered he was dying of cancer and confided to Robinson that the C&R trio had used him against Robinson for "purely mercenary ends".

In 1963 de Malmanche was appointed by the Second National Government as New Zealand's Resident High Commissioner to India. He held the post until 1965.

Notes

References

1900 births
1988 deaths
Auckland City Councillors
20th-century New Zealand politicians
High Commissioners of New Zealand to India